If Only for One Night is the eighth studio album by American country music singer Lee Greenwood. The album was released on May 26, 1989, by MCA Records.

Track listing

Personnel
Adapted from liner notes.

Alfie Bilas - background vocals
Steve Dorff - string arrangements
Gail Farrell - background vocals
Sonny Garrish - steel guitar
Steve Gibson - electric guitar, mandolin
Lee Greenwood - lead vocals
Eric Horner - acoustic guitar
Steve Mandile - acoustic guitar, electric guitar, background vocals
The Nashville String Machine - strings
Matt McKenzie - bass guitar
Terry McMillan - harmonica
Matt Rollings - piano
Tony Smith - keyboards, background vocals
James Stroud - percussion
Chuck Tilley - drums, percussion

Charts

References

1989 albums
Lee Greenwood albums
MCA Records albums
Albums produced by James Stroud